Stefan Leslie (born October 23, 1987) is a Canadian soccer player currently playing for Surrey United in the Vancouver Metro Soccer League.

Career

Youth and College
Leslie was born in Richmond, British Columbia. Leslie attended William F. Davidson Elementary School in Surrey, British Columbia, North Surrey Secondary School, and played college soccer at Trinity Western University, having represented the Spartans in basketball, football, soccer, and track & field. In 2006, Leslie was Canada West Rookie of the Year and a Canada West Second Team All-Star. He also played amateur club soccer for Surrey FC Pegasus Metro and the Columbus Clan.

Professional
Leslie signed for the Vancouver Whitecaps of the USL First Division in 2006, subsequently playing in 17 games over two years with the team. During 2008 Leslie was loaned to the Whitecaps' development team, Vancouver Whitecaps Residency in the USL Premier Development League, helping them to the Western Conference title.

On December 10, 2008, Leslie was released from his contract with the Whitecaps. Having been unable to secure a professional contract, Leslie signed with Abbotsford Mariners of the USL Premier Development League for the 2009 season.
Currently, Leslie is playing locally with the Surrey United Firefighters in the Vancouver Metro Soccer League for the winter, he is looking to make the jump back into the professional ranks in the 2010.

International career
Leslie has represented Canada at U-17 and  U-23 level.

Personal life
Leslie's father originally hails from Barbados, while his mother comes from Trinidad and Tobago.

Coaching career
During the off-season, Leslie helps former Whitecaps teammate Jeff Clarke run soccer academy programs at Guildford Athletic Club. Leslie also coaches at Surrey United SC, working with teams within the BC Soccer Premier League.

References

External links 
 Trinity Western Spartans Profile

1987 births
Living people
Canadian soccer players
Canadian people of Barbadian descent
Canadian sportspeople of Trinidad and Tobago descent
Vancouver Whitecaps (1986–2010) players
Vancouver Whitecaps Residency players
Fraser Valley Mariners players
Black Canadian soccer players
Soccer people from British Columbia
People from Richmond, British Columbia
USL First Division players
USL League Two players
Association football midfielders